Ian Claes (born 16 July 1981 in Sint-Truiden) is a retired Belgian professional footballer. During his career, he played as a forward for Sint-Truiden, Heerenveen, KV Mechelen, Oud-Heverlee Leuven and Tongeren.

As a promising youngster with Sint-Truiden, Claes was selected for two 2000 UEFA European Under-18 Football Championship qualifying matches in 1999 and signed by Dutch team Heerenveen led by Foppe de Haan. As De Haan was impressed, Claes was immediately brought into the first team, playing the first two matches of the 2000-01 season. For unclear reasons, he never played any matches for Heerenveen thereafter, moving back to Belgium the next season at Mechelen. Although Claes gained 4 caps for the Belgium U21 during the 2002 UEFA European Under-21 Football Championship qualification, scoring one goal against Latvia, he only featured in three matches and during the 2002–03 season, Mechelen loaned him out to Belgian Third Division team OH Leuven. As a result of Mechelen being refused a Belgian professional football license after going into liquidation later that season, the contract of Claes was annulled, causing him to be a free player after his loan spell at OH Leuven. He played one more season at Tongeren, before quitting professional football.

References

1981 births
Living people
Belgian footballers
Belgian Pro League players
Sint-Truidense V.V. players
SC Heerenveen players
K.V. Mechelen players
Oud-Heverlee Leuven players
Eredivisie players
Belgian expatriate sportspeople in the Netherlands
Belgian expatriate footballers
Expatriate footballers in the Netherlands
Association football forwards
People from Sint-Truiden
Footballers from Limburg (Belgium)